Lamp, Lamps or LAMP may refer to:

Lighting
 Oil lamp, using an oil-based fuel source
 Kerosene lamp, using kerosene as a fuel 
 Electric lamp, or light bulb, a replaceable component that produces light from electricity
 Light fixture, or light fitting or luminaire, is an electrical device containing an electric lamp that provides illumination
 Signal lamp, or Aldis lamp or Morse lamp, a semaphore system for optical communication
 Safety lamp, any of several types of lamp that provides illumination in coal mines
 Davy lamp

Arts, entertainment and media

Film and television
 The Lamp (1987 film), or The Outing, a horror film
 The Lamp (2011 film), an American drama
 Lamp (advertisement), a 2002 television and cinema advertisement for IKEA

Music
 Lamp (band), a Japanese indie band
 "Lamp", a song by Bump of Chicken from the 1999 album The Living Dead

Literature
 Lamp, a newspaper in Delaware
 The Lamp (magazine), American bimonthly Catholic magazine, founded in 2019
 The Lamp, a Catholic periodical, founded in 1846, edited for a time by Frances Margaret Taylor
 The Lamp: A Catholic Monthly Devoted to Church Unity and Missions, an American periodical published by the Society of the Atonement, 1903-1973
 The Lamp, periodical published by the American Committee for the Protection of Foreign Born

Businesses and organisations
 Loveless Academic Magnet Program, a high school in Montgomery, Alabama, U.S.
 LAMP Community, a Los Angeles-based nonprofit organization
 Lighthouse Archaeological Maritime Program, at St. Augustine Light, Florida, U.S.

People
 Lamp (surname), including a list of people with the surname
 Frank Lampard (born 1978), nickname "Lamps", English football player and manager

Science and technology
 LAMP (software bundle) (Linux, Apache, MySQL, PHP/Perl/Python)
 Library Access to Music Project, a free music library for MIT students
 Localized Aviation MOS Program (LAMP), a model output statistics system used in weather prediction
 Loop-mediated isothermal amplification, a single tube technique for the amplification of DNA
 Lyman Alpha Mapping Project, an instrument on the NASA Lunar Reconnaissance Orbiter
 Lysosome-associated membrane glycoprotein, including LAMP1, LAMP2, LAMP3

Other uses
 Light Airborne Multi-Purpose System (LAMPS), a United States Navy program

See also

 Lamping (disambiguation)
 Lighting
 Lampadarius, a slave who carried torches
 Fragrance lamp, a lamp that disperses scented alcohol using a heated stone attached to a cotton wick
 :Category:Types of lamp